Anmol is a 1993 Indian film directed by Ketan Desai and produced by his father Manmohan Desai and starring Rishi Kapoor, Manisha Koirala in lead roles. This was the final film produced by Manmohan Desai before his death in 1994. The plot is loosely based on the fairytale Cinderella.

Cast 
 Rishi Kapoor as Prem
 Manisha Koirala as Anmol
 Puneet Issar as Zafar
 Dara Singh as Shamsher
 Anil Dhawan
 Gufi Paintal
 Jaya Mathur as Champa / Chameli (Double Role)

Soundtrack 
Audio is available on CDs, LPs and Digital Downloads by Tips Industries.
Music is conducted by Raamlaxman, arranged by Uttam Singh, and lyrics of songs written by Maya Govind, Dev Kohli, Rani Malik, Ravinder Rawal and Raamlaxman.

References

External links 
 

1993 films
Indian romance films
1990s Hindi-language films
Films scored by Raamlaxman
1990s romance films
Hindi-language romance films